ʻAbd al-Ḥaqq (ALA-LC romanization of ) is an Arabic male given name, and in modern usage, surname. It is built from the Arabic words ʻabd and al-Ḥaqq, one of the names of God in the Qur'an, which give rise to the Muslim theophoric names. It means "servant of the Truth".

It may refer to:

People
Abd al-Haqq I (died 1217), Marinid sheikh (Morocco)
Uthman ibn Abd al-Haqq (died 1240), son of Abd al-Haqq I
Muhammad ibn Abd Al-Haqq (died 1244), son of Abd al-Haqq I
Abu Yahya ibn Abd al-Haqq (died 1258), son of Abd al-Haqq I
Abu Yusuf Yaqub ibn Abd Al-Haqq (died 1286), son of Abd al-Haqq I
Abdul Haque (1918–1997), Bangladeshi author
Abdul Hoque (1930–1971), Bangladeshi politician
Abu Mohammed Abd el-Hakh Ibn Sabin (1217–1269), Spanish Sufi philosopher
Abdul-Haqq Dehlavi (1551–1642), Indian scholar
Abdülhak Hâmid Tarhan (1851–1937), Turkish playwright and poet
Maulvi Abdul Haq (Urdu scholar) (1872–1961), Pakistani Urdu-language scholar
Abdülhak Adnan Adıvar (1882–1955), Turkish politician
Miangul Abdul-Haqq Jahan Zeb, or just Miangul Jahan Zeb (1908–1987), ruler of Swat (Pakistan)
 Abdul Haq Akorwi (1912 – 1988), founder of Darul Uloom Haqqania.
Mehr Abdul Haq (1915–1995), Pakistani linguist
 Abdul Haq Azmi (1928 – 2016), former Shaykh al-Hadith of Darul Uloom Deoband
Abdul Haq Ansari (born 1931), Indian religious scholar
Shaher Abdulhak (born ca. 1938), Yemeni businessman
Abd al Haqq Kielan (born 1941), Swedish imam
Abdul Haq (Afghan leader) (1958–2001), Afghan leader against both the communists and the Taliban
Abdelhak Achik (born 1959), Moroccan featherweight boxer (1988 Olympics)
Huda bin Abdul Haq (1960–2008), Indonesian executed for terrorism
Abdelhak Benchikha (born 1963), Algerian football manager
Mohamed Abdelhak Achik, or just Mohammed Achik (born 1965), Moroccan bantamweight boxer (1992 Olympics)
Abdul Haq (ETIP) (born 1971), Uyghur Islamic militant and current leader of the Islamic extremist group Turkistan Islamic Party
Abdul Haq Wasiq (born ca. 1971), Afghan held in Guantanamo
Mohammed Abdelhak Zakaria (born 1974), Moroccan-Bahraini runner
Abdul-Haq, Muslim name of Anthony Small (born 1981), British boxer
Abdelhaq Ait Laarif (born 1983), Moroccan footballer
Abdelhak Boutasgount (born 1986), French footballer
Abdul Haq Bin Seidu Osman, or just Abdul Osman (born 1987), Ghanaian-English footballer
Abdul Haq Shafaq, Afghan politician
Abdelhak Layada, Algerian Islamic militant
Abdul Haque Faridi, Bangladeshi academic

See also
 Haqq (surname)

References

Arabic masculine given names
Turkish masculine given names